Since 2019, Ex-Muslim new atheism has been developing into salient collectivization of activism in Kerala. Until 2021, most forms of activism had been mainly limited to online social media platforms. Since 2021-2022, an offline debate among Kerala's prominent intellectuals, some organizational mechanism has been formalizing for support of Ex-Muslim activism in Kerala.

History of Ex-Muslims of Kerala 

Kerala-based Indian ex-Muslim freethinkers started an atheist and rationalist organization named 'Ex-Muslims of Kerala' intending to offer a platform and support to those who have stopped practicing Islam and aiming to reduce the discrimination faced by those who leave Islam. It is the first organization of its kind in India and focuses on activism in the Malayalam language of Kerala and seeks to protect the human rights and dignity of ex-Muslims and ensure the right to religious freedom promised by the Constitution of India. They also plan to move the courts against instances of human rights violations perpetrated in the name of traditions of faith or practices. According to P. Sandeep organizational formation of Ex-Muslim movement can be seen as a salient milestone in the collectivisation of dissent among apostates from Islam in Kerala.

Ex-Muslim day 
Beginning in 2022, Ex-Muslims of Kerala observe the 9th of January as "Ex-Muslim Day". On January 9, 2021, rationalist E A Jabbar had a public debate about the scientific miracles in the Quran with the highly popular Islamic preacher M. M. Akbar. The three hour debate held in Malappuram went viral, amassing a number of views on YouTube; this debate served as the gateway to apostasy for many practicing Islamists. The 9th of January was proposed as "Ex-Muslim Day" when the organization was formed.

Activism activities 
The Facebook community "Ex-Muslims of Kerala" originated from a broader atheist group, then branched off in 2019 as support for the movement gained traction from numerous Kerala ex-Muslims. Most of ex-Muslim activism occurs through various social media platforms. Members share information and communicate with others through blogs, Facebook, YouTube and Clubhouse to promote independent thinking free from religious influence. Of note, Clubhouse houses ex-Muslim discussions as a platform for debating with Islamists, organizing talks regarding various humanitarian topics, and identifying new ex-Muslims.

Backlash against ex-Muslims 
While Clubhouse discussions are publicly viewable, many ex-Muslim Clubhouse users said that they felt confident enough to express their views on the app, but choose to use pseudonyms in an effort to conceal their identity to avoid targeted harassment and retaliation.

According to P. Sandeep, those who leave Islam tend to face socioeconomic ostracism and even violence from the hardliners in the Muslim community.

In one example of social ostracism, after leaving Islam, Ex-Muslim Arif Hussain Theruvath's wife left him and does not allow him to see his children. In an effort to avoid social and financial backlash associated with Ex-Muslim activism, some Ex-Muslims flee Kerala. In another example of overseas persecution, given by P. Sandeep, the personal information of social media activist Abdul Khader Puthiyangadi seem to have been doxed along with a complaint to Dubai authorities and as a result, sentenced to jail there in Dubai (as of the report day 27 January 2022) for activism done exclusively in Malayalam language when Puthiyangadi was in Kerala.

In early May 2022, a 24-year ex-Muslim youth Aksar Ali of Malappuram; who preferred to be separated from the family for objecting his relinquishing of Islam; was rescued by Kollam police from a situation where in he was manhandled  in a bid to stop him from delivering a speech regarding his alleged experiences of sexual harassment during his studies and his journey towards “the path of humanism”  for an organisation  Essense Global, which happens to promote “scientific temper, humanism and the spirit of inquiry and reform in society”, subsequently Ali's speech was held  under police protection.

Media interactions 
According to Arif Hussain Theruvath, though every religion discriminates against atheists, Islam tends to take extreme position and there are many issues like how Islam approves beating of women is questionable where as moderate scholar Shaista Amber of All India Muslim Women's Personal Law Board explains Theruvath, saying every religion should have space for own atheists along with a platform for criticism and debate about Islam since according to Amber Islam neither is supposed to be against women nor supposed to be extreme.

See also 

 Central Council of Ex-Muslims (Germany)
 Council of Ex-Muslims of Britain
 EA Jabbar
List of ex-Muslim organisations
Ex-Muslims of North America

Bibliography 

 https://thehillstimes.in/featured/ex-muslim-movement-dissension-or-reformation

References 

2021 establishments in Kerala
Organisations based in Kochi
Organizations established in 2021
Former Muslims organizations
Non-profit organisations based in India
Rationalist groups based in India